Macfarlane Group PLC is a packaging and label company headquartered in Glasgow, Scotland. The group holding company is listed on the London Stock Exchange, (MACF:LSE).

History 
Founded in 1949 by Lord Macfarlane of Bearsden KT, Macfarlane Group started life as a commercial stationary company in Bath Street, Glasgow. The company flourished and was floated on the London Stock Exchange in 1973.  

In the 1980s, Macfarlane Group entered the packaging distribution market after acquiring Abbots and became ISO qualified, meeting international quality standards.  

After a period of growth in the 90s, the business expanded its share of the packaging distribution market by acquiring National Packaging in 2001 and Network Packaging in 2014, as well as Nelsons for Cartons Packaging in 2016 and Greenwoods Stock Boxes in 2017. This was followed by Tyler Packaging (Leicester) Ltd and Harrison's Packaging Ltd in 2018.

Divisions 
Macfarlane Group has three core divisions: Packaging Distribution; Design & Manufacture; and Labels.

Packaging Distribution 
Macfarlane Packaging is the UK's largest distributor of protective packaging products and services. It serves over 20,000 businesses nationwide and contributes most the group's revenue.   

The packaging distribution arm of Macfarlane Group operates through a network of regional distribution centres in the UK, as well as a site in Ireland and two sites across continental Europe.  

Key market sectors serviced include eCommerce, third party logistics, manufacturing, retail, industrial, automotive, electronics and aerospace.

Design & Manufacture 

It has two locations primary locations in the UK for design and production. The packaging produced is then delivered nationally via the Distribution arm of Macfarlane Group.  

Key market sectors for Macfarlane Design & Manufacture include industrial, automotive, defence, aerospace, electronics and medical.

Labels 
Macfarlane Labels specialises in the design, printing, and supply of self-adhesive and resealable labels for FMCG manufacturers.  

This division of Macfarlane Group has distribution partners in the UK, Europe, and the US, alongside research facilities in Scotland and Sweden.  

Primary market sectors served by Macfarlane Labels include health & beauty, household goods, beverage, pharmaceuticals, and food.

References

Manufacturing companies based in Glasgow
1949 establishments in Scotland
British companies established in 1949